The  was Japanese aerial lift line in Aso, Kumamoto, operated by .

Overview 

It was opened in 1958, and climbs Mount Aso. Its official website claims it was the first aerial lift in the world to be built on an active volcano.  It went up from the west side of the crater edge, each 15-20 min. It only ran during Volcanic Alert Level 1 (normal).

It often stopped operating due to higher Volcanic Alert Levels. The last operation time was in August 2014.

Aso Super Ring 

On the first floor of the original rope station building, there was a 3D projector showing the Mount Aso scenes of 4 seasons, and the geographic history of craters.

Dismantle 

During the 2016 Kumamoto earthquakes, the cable station and ropes were damaged by volcanic ash and earthquake. On 28 February 2018, the crater access restriction was lifted, the ropeway stayed close. A shuttle bus service runs from the original boarding area, Mount Aso terminal to crater's edge as replacement. On 12 October 2018, it was announced to dismantle the station and ropes, target to finish by spring 2019.

See also
List of aerial lifts in Japan

References
 

 

Aerial tramways in Japan
1958 establishments in Japan